Aaron Joseph Meeks (born April 26, 1986) is an American actor. He was born in Watts, California, and is best known for his role as Ahmad Chadway on the Showtime television series Soul Food (2000−04). During his acting career, Meeks was awarded two NAACP Image Awards and received three Young Artist Award nominations.

Career
Meeks stated acting in childhood as a member of the Cornerstone Theater Company troupe. His brother, Andrew, was also a child actor. Aaron made his screen debut in 1999 on medical drama Diagnosis: Murder, playing an abused young boy. In 2000, Meeks appeared as Herman D. Washington in the Showtime movie A Storm in Summer, starring opposite Peter Falk. Their characters form an unlikely friendship. One reviewer found Meeks' performance "impressive." He earned a Young Artist Award nomination in 2001 for his work in this film. Meeks portrayed a young Cassius Clay in Ali: An American Hero (2000) and acted in the Gregory Hines television film Bojangles (2001).

Meeks portrayed the role of Ahmad Chadway, a teenager who attends prep school, on drama series Soul Food. He also narrated the series as Ahmad. Meeks played the role from 2000 to 2004. For playing Ahmad, he won two consecutive NAACP Image Awards for Outstanding Youth Actor in 2001 and 2002. In 2003, he received an NAACP Image Award nomination in the category of Outstanding Supporting Actor in a Drama Series. Additionally, Meeks was given two Young Artist Award nominations in 2003 and 2004 for his performance on Soul Food.

Following his work on Soul Food, he appeared in television film Redemption: The Stan Tookie Williams Story (2004) and had a guest role on crime drama Crossing Jordan (2007). Meeks has not acted since 2007.

Filmography

Film

Television

Awards and nominations

References

External links

AOL profile

1986 births
Male actors from California
American male film actors
American male television actors
African-American male actors
Living people
21st-century African-American people
20th-century African-American people